Schildkraut is a German surname. Notable people with the surname include:

Dave Schildkraut (1925–1998), American jazz alto saxophonist
Fruzsina Schildkraut (1998–), Hungarian footballer
Joseph Schildkraut (1896–1964), Austrian/American actor
Rudolph Schildkraut (1862–1930), Austrian/American actor

German-language surnames
Jewish surnames
Yiddish-language surnames